Johannes Thomae Bureus Agrivillensis (born Johan Bure; 1568–1652) was a Swedish polymath, antiquarian, mystic, royal librarian, poet, and tutor and adviser of King Gustavus Adolphus of Sweden. He is a well-known exponent of Gothicism.

Life and career 
Bureus was born in 1568 in Åkerby near Uppsala – where the largest and last of the pagan temples once was – in Sweden, as a son of a Lutheran parish priest. He was Sweden's first national antiquarian (riksantikvarie) and first head of Sweden's national library (riksbibliotekarie). He was also the first to document runes. He has been called the father of the Swedish grammar. In 1599, he designed the coats of arms of Helsinki and Uusimaa.

Bureus combined his runic and esoteric interests in his own runic system, which he called the "Adalruna". He was interested in the Rosicrucian manifestos. Contemporary mystics such as Jakob Böhme have studied his works. In 1611, Bureus published the first ever ABC book written in – and about – the Swedish language, Svenska ABC boken medh runor, using the runic alphabet and Latin script. He also wrote a genealogy of the Bure family, partly using runestones as sources.

In popular culture 
 The CD-R 'Der Mitternacht Löwe' by experimental band Shadowseeds is based on Bureus' life and teachings.
 The 2007 Gothic Kabbalah album by Swedish metal band Therion refers Bureus as a concept. The song "Son of the staves of time" is an example: "Byrger Tidesson, from the ancient time, runic ancestor, the last of your line"
 The name of the British black metal band Adalruna and the theme of their first demo Rediviva is based on Bureus and his rune system.

References

Further reading 
Thomas Karlsson: Götisk kabbala och runisk alkemi: Johannes Bureus och den götiska esoterismen. (Dissertation, Stockholm 2010.)
Håkan Håkansson: Alchemy of the Ancient Goths: Johannes Bureus’ Search for the Lost Wisdom of Scandinavia. Early Science and Medicine 17 (2012), pp. 500–522. View article

External links 
Article in English Gangleri's article with bibliographical references and more links.
Short article about the Rune Cross.

1568 births
1652 deaths
16th-century Christian mystics
17th-century antiquarians
17th-century Christian mystics
17th-century linguists
Grammarians from Sweden
Linguists from Sweden
People from Uppsala Municipality
Rosicrucians
Runologists
Swedish antiquarians
Swedish Christian mystics
Swedish genealogists
Swedish librarians